Vallonia gracilicosta, common name the multirib vallonia or multiribbed vallonia,  is a species of very small, air-breathing land snail, a terrestrial pulmonate gastropod mollusk in the family Valloniidae.

Subspecies 
The subspecies, Vallonia gracilicosta albula, is an endangered species in the U.S. State of Michigan.

Distribution 

This species occurs in:

 Canada: Alberta, British Columbia, Manitoba, Newfoundland Island, Nunavut, Ontario and Quebec.
 United States of America: Arizona, California, Colorado, Idaho, Illinois, Indiana, Iowa, Kansas, Kentucky, Maine, Massachusetts, Michigan, Minnesota, Missouri, Montana, Nebraska, New Mexico, New York, North Dakota, Oklahoma, Rhode Island, South Dakota, Texas, Utah, Wisconsin and Wyoming.

References

Valloniidae
Gastropods described in 1883